The 1935–36 Scottish Division One season was won by Celtic by five points over city rival Rangers. Airdrieonians and Ayr United finished 19th and 20th respectively and were relegated to the 1936–37 Scottish Division Two.

League table

Results

References 

 Statto.com

1935–36 Scottish Football League
Scottish Division One seasons
Scot